Charles Andrew Talcott (June 10, 1857 – February 27, 1920) was an American politician who served one term as a Democratic member of the U.S. House of Representatives from New York from 1913 to 1915.

Biography 
Talcott was born in Oswego, New York. He graduated from Princeton University in 1879. He was mayor of Utica, New York from 1902 until 1906.

Congress 
He was elected to Congress in 1910 and served from March 4, 1911, until March 3, 1915.

Death and burial 
He died in Utica and was interred in Forest Hill Cemetery.

Sources

External links

1857 births
1920 deaths
Mayors of Utica, New York
Princeton University alumni
Democratic Party members of the United States House of Representatives from New York (state)
Burials at Forest Hill Cemetery (Utica, New York)